Edward Nolan (August 14, 1888 - July 17, 1943) was an American actor of silent film.

Biography

Filmography
 1914: Making a Living
 1914: Between Showers, Chivalrous Policeman
 1914: Mabel at the Wheel, Spectator (uncredited)
 1914: The Knockout
 1914: The Face on the Bar Room Floor, Bartender (as Eddie Nolan)
 1914: Recreation
 1914: Gentlemen of Nerve
 1914: Tillie's Punctured Romance
 1915: Court House Crooks

External links
 

1888 births
1943 deaths
American male film actors
American male silent film actors
20th-century American male actors